Clarice Marjoribanks Beckett (21 March 1887 – 7 July 1935) was an Australian artist and a key member of the Australian tonalist movement. Known for her subtle, misty landscapes of Melbourne and its suburbs, Beckett developed a personal style that is now considered an early contribution to modernism in Australia. Disregarded by the art establishment during her lifetime, and largely forgotten in the decades after her death, she is now considered one of Australia's greatest artists.

Born and raised in the country town of Casterton, Victoria, Beckett was seen as extremely shy from a young age, as well as bright and artistic. In 1914, after moving to Melbourne with her family, she began a three-year study at the National Gallery School under Australian impressionist painter Frederick McCubbin, then for nine months attended the rival school of art theorist Max Meldrum, a controversial outlier of the Australian art world who propounded his own tonalist painting system drawn from scientific principles. Beckett and others in Meldrum's circle, derided as "Meldrumites" by his critics, began staging group exhibitions in 1919. Beckett also exhibited with the Meldrum-inspired Twenty Melbourne Painters Society, and staged the first of her ten annual solo exhibitions in 1923.

Beckett never left Victoria and rarely travelled outside Melbourne,  much of her adult life being spent caring for her ailing parents at their home in bayside Beaumaris. She did however paint prolifically, often en plein air in and around Beaumaris, and mostly at daybreak or towards evening, when she was exempted from domestic duties. In her method and choice of "everyday" subject matter, Beckett remained indebted to Meldrum, but her work also differed from that of other tonalists, in part due to its emotional and spiritual qualities, reflecting her interest in Buddhism, Theosophy and Freud. By 1926, she was creating landscapes unprecedented in Australian art for their "radical simplicity", and from 1930, she experimented further with a broader colour palette and more challenging compositions. In 1935, while painting the sea off Beaumaris during a winter storm, Beckett contracted pneumonia and died four days later, aged 48.

In what has been called "one of the great disasters of Australian art history", well over one thousand of Beckett's works were destroyed in the decades after her death, including many by her father that he deemed "unfinished"—works from her final years that were said by friends to be more abstract and spiritual. More works were lost in a bush fire, and in 1970, in an open-sided shed in country Victoria, as many as two thousand works were found abandoned, two thirds of which had been destroyed by the elements. Those that did survive were exhibited the following year in Melbourne, precipitating a resurgence of interest in Beckett. Catalogues, biographies and major exhibitions followed, and today she is represented in Australia's national and state galleries.

Life

Family and early years

Beckett was born in 1887 in Casterton, Victoria, the eldest daughter of Elizabeth Kate, née Brown (c.1855-1934), and Joseph Clifden Beckett (c.1852-1936), Freemason and organist and manager of the town's Colonial Bank in which Beckett was born. She was sister of Hilda Raby, who married Thomas  Mangan, 2 November 1922. Her grandfather was John Brown, a Scottish master builder, who had designed and built Como House, and its gardens, in South Yarra, Victoria.

Undertaking her primary education in Casterton, for secondary school Beckett was a boarder at Queen's College, Ballarat, until 1903, where she revealed strong drawing ability and wrote a play, including a part for herself, which was performed by the students, and in 1905 won a competition to write on the moral lessons of Walter Melville's play A Girl's Cross Roads. To foster her artistic skill, she took private lessons in charcoal drawing in Ballarat.

After her family's relocation to 22 Kensington Road, South Yarra, she finished her final year of school at the nearby Merton Hall campus of Melbourne Church of England Girls' Grammar School. In 1914, she attended Melbourne's National Gallery School, completing three years of study under Frederick McCubbin, before continuing her studies under Max Meldrum, whose controversial theories became a pivotal factor in her own art practice.

In 1919, her parents moved from Bendigo, where Beckett and her sister Hilda were of the class whose social engagements were noted in the papers, to the then undeveloped Melbourne bayside suburb of Beaumaris into an existing dwelling on a double block at 14 Dalgetty Road on the corner of Tramway Parade, which they named St. Enoch's after their Barkly Place, Bendigo house where they had settled in 1917.

With her parents' health failing, and after her sister's marriage in 1922, Beckett assumed household responsibilities that dictated the structure of the rest of her life, limiting her artistic endeavours though she joined painting and camping excursions with groups of other Tonalists, including the artists Lily and Justus Jorgensen, Percy Leason and Colin Colahan and their families into the hills of Eltham, Olinda, and to Anglesea (c.1929), Lorne and San Remo (c.1930s) on the coast, as her paintings of these locations attest, and she met with them at the Café Latin in Exhibition Street. In 1926 Beckett painted during a six month sojourn in the Western District using as a studio the upper level of a shearing shed at the Naringal property of the brother of her good friend, Maud Rowe, At home in Beaumaris, Beckett could only go out during the dawn and dusk to paint as most of her day was spent caring for her parents, more intensively from 1932 when her mother became seriously ill, before dying in 1934. Beckett's father, though becoming frail, moved from Beaumaris , after burning her paintings he considered were 'unfinished,' and died 12 June 1936 in St Kilda, leaving an estate of £2520 to Hilda.

Australian tonalism

After joining Meldrum's school, Beckett adopted aspects of his unique tonalist system of painting, the "Scientific Order of Impressions", which resulted in a style now known as Australian tonalism, characterised by a particular "misty" or atmospheric quality created by building "tone on tone". In a 1999 analysis, John Christian paraphrases Meldrum's conviction that art "should be a pure science based on optical analysis; its sole purpose being to place on the canvas the first ordered tonal impressions that the eye received. All adornments and narrative and literary references should be rejected". The Australian tonalists opposed impressionism and modernist art styles, The whole movement had been the subject of fierce controversy. Its practitioners were unpopular amongst other artists, and derided as "Meldrumites". Influential Melbourne modernist artist and teacher George Bell, founder of the Contemporary Art Society,  described Australian Tonalism as a "cult which muffles everything in a pall of opaque density".

Beckett persistently and diligently painted, extending Meldrum's principles to subjects en plein air, and was highly productive, mounting a solo show every year from 1923 to 1933. Her subjects were sea and beachscapes, and rural and suburban scenes, often enveloped in the atmospheric effects of early mornings or evening. Early critical appraisal of her paintings was mixed, with members of the conservative art establishment often finding fault in their "opaque" quality. Surveying her work in 1931 'A.C.' of The Age recalled that; When Miss Clarice Beckett held her first show at the Athenæum gallery in 1923 her work certainly found admirers, but the admiration was by no means general, and there was a good deal of confusion in the public mind as to whether she was a futurist, or only a new and dangerous variety of Meldrumite.Reviewing one of her shows, an earlier critic from The Age wrote that "one would imagine from the little scenes that Miss Beckett has gathered, in the name of Australian art, that Australia was in a continual state of fog—all kinds of fogs—pink, blue, green and grey with an occasional mist that surely was never on land or sea."

In 1925, Herald reviewer and staunch anti-modernist James S. MacDonald was especially derogatory, favouring, if anything, the flower studies that Beckett regarded as minor in comparison with her landscapes. By 1931, however, her friend and colleague among the Tonalists Percy Leason, writing a long review in Table Talk, said that Beckett's work showed "a convincing illusion of actual space and air and light; the same refinement and delicacy of true color; the same regard for true form and character; and the same complete indifference to conventions and the mere clever handling of paint for the sake of it."

Meldrum himself asserted that 'There would never be a great woman artist and there never had been' but recognised Beckett as his most skilled pupil, saying that 'she worked like a man', that she had done work 'of which any nation would be proud,' and that she 'ranked as a great artist.'

Modernism 

As recognised in a newspaper critique of her 1931 solo exhibition Beckett's painting departs from Meldrum's dictum that tone should take precedence over colour. While Meldrum blamed social decadence for 'modern' artists' exaggerated interest in colour over tone and proportion, a uncredited Age reviewer of her 1932 Atheneum show expressed her particular version of his  principles as being "an adaptation of art to nature, which belongs neither to the realm of the orthodox normalist or the avowed modern, but is a purely individual expression of certain sensations in light, form and color..."

Rosalind Hollinrake, who was largely responsible for Beckett's revival in 1970, notes a use of colour to reinforce form, and more daring design, in the later years of the artist's short life. in 1971 The Age critic Patrick McCaughey considered Beckett "a remarkable modernist," situating her as an equal to Grace Cossington Smith and Margaret Preston, and "both a Meldrumite and a pioneering modernist." Artist and critic Nancy Borlase wrote on the occasion of Beckett's 1979 Macquarie Galleries retrospective that launched Hollinrake's Clarice Beckett-The Artist and Her Circle. Her review draws attention to Beckett's reductionism that "presage the work of Barnett Newman and [Jules] Olitski," of forty years later, and "solitude and stillness" as her leitmotif.

However, even in 2001, Tim Bonyhady, discussing the "Modern Australian Women" exhibition in which Beckett was included at the Art Gallery of South Australia, acknowledges its director Ron Radford's observation that women artists Margaret Preston, Clarice Beckett, Grace Cossington Smith, Grace Crowley, Dorrit Black and Kathleen O'Connor were "more adventurous than their male counterparts in what and how they painted," but baulks at his notion that they were "the major Australian artists of the 1920s and 1930s."

Death
While painting the sea off Beaumaris during a storm in 1935, Beckett developed pneumonia and died four days later, aged 48, in a hospital at Sandringham. She was buried in the Cheltenham Memorial Park.

Work and style

Beckett elucidated her artistic aims in what is her only known surviving written statement, published in the catalogue accompanying the sixth annual exhibition of the Twenty Melbourne Painters Society, held in 1924:
To give a sincere and truthful representation of a portion of the beauty of Nature, and to show the charm of light and shade, which I try to give forth in correct tones so as to give as nearly as possible an exact illusion of reality.

Despite a talent for portraiture and a keen public appreciation for her still lifes, the subject matter favoured by her teacher Meldrum, Beckett preferred the solo, outdoor process of painting landscapes. Her subjects were often drawn from the Beaumaris area, where she lived for the latter part of her life. She was one of the first of Meldrum's group to use a painting trolley, or mobile easel to make it easier to paint outdoors in different locations.

Legacy 

During her lifetime, Beckett was not represented in any public collection in Australia, though her sister donated one work and friend Maud Rowe bequeathed three to the Castlemaine Art Museum shortly after her death, with others going to the Art Gallery of Ballarat in 1937; now almost every major Australian gallery now holds examples of her work, including the National Gallery of Australia which purchased eight of her works on the recommendation to James Mollison by the artist Fred Williams in 1971. Williams wrote; We called in at the Humphries Gal & a real surprise, an exhibition by 'Clarice Beckett' 1887-35. She really was ahead of her time. I found it very interesting to compare her early best work with Blackman's early paintings, that same lyrical feeling ...By 2001, her paintings had achieved six figure sums at auction.

In 1936, a major memorial exhibition was organised at the Melbourne Athenaeum by Beckett's sister and father. In 1971, Beckett's sister alerted Hollinrake to a tragedy; more than 2,000 of her works had been left abandoned to the elements and vermin in an open-sided hay shed near Benalla. Most were unsalvageable, but thirty well-preserved but neglected works were discovered at the Montsalvat artist colony, sent there when the Beaumaris home was cleared. An image of at least one of the lost works survives (see external links below).

Five commercial gallery exhibitions of Beckett's work were staged from 1971 to 1980. The first museum exhibition of her work, "In a Certain Light" (a two-person show with photographer Olive Cotton) was curated by Felicity Fenner and artist Jenny Bell for UNSW's Ivan Dougherty Gallery in 1995. Over 1999 and 2000, the retrospective exhibition "Politically incorrect: Clarice Beckett" was organised by the Ian Potter Museum of Art, University of Melbourne, and Rosalind Hollinrake. It toured eight national galleries.

During the 2021 Adelaide Festival, the Art Gallery of South Australia staged the exhibition "Clarice Beckett: The Present Moment". Her most comprehensive retrospective to date, it featured 160 works, including a long-lost portrait that had recently been rediscovered. It drew large crowds and was the most successful ticketed solo exhibition in the museum's 140-year history. Between April and July 2023, the Geelong Art Gallery will stage the retrospective "Clarice Beckett—Atmosphere".

She is memorialised in 'Clarice Beckett's Lane' in the adjoining suburb of Black Rock, and in the naming of Beckett Ward, one of seven City of Bayside municipal wards. Ballarat Grammar, where the artist studied, awards the Clarice Beckett Prize annually to a student for outstanding achievement in the study of Art at VCE level. In her honour she is the eponym of Beckett, a crater on the planet Mercury, discovered in 2008 and named by the International Astronomical Union.

Cultural references 
Kristel Thornell's debut novel Night Street (2009) is a fictionalised account of Beckett's life. It co-won The Australian/Vogel Literary Award, and won the Dobbie Literary Award.

Patrick White wrote in March 1975 to Stephen Murray-Smith of Overland about Herbert Dyce Murphy, gentleman transvestite, whose claim to be the standing figure in The arbour by E. Phillips Fox in the NGV had inspired White's next novel, The Twyborn Affair described as vivid and painterly in its representation of landscape. White asked; “Do you know a Melbourne painter called Clarice Beckett? Some of those landscapes seem to belong to the Murphy thing.”

A number of Beckett's paintings feature as a plot point in the 2022 film Poker Face, directed by and starring Russell Crowe. An avid collector of Beckett's work, Crowe used real Beckett paintings from his personal collection, as well as some from the Art Gallery of New South Wales.

Selected paintings

Exhibitions

Solo exhibitions

 1923 June, Athenaeum Gallery
 1924 September, Athenaeum Gallery
 1925 July, Athenaeum Gallery
 1926 July 20–31, Athenaeum Gallery
 1927 September, Athenaeum Gallery
 1928 July, Athenaeum Gallery
 1929 November, Athenaeum Gallery
 1930 October, Athenaeum Gallery
 1931 October, Athenaeum Gallery (show opened by Max Meldrum)
 1932 March, The Meldrum Gallery
 1932 October, Athenaeum Gallery
 1933 November, The Meldrum Gallery

Group exhibitions 
 1918 May, Victorian Artists' Society Autumn Exhibition, East Melbourne
 1918 September, Victorian Artists' Society Spring Exhibition, East Melbourne
 1919 September, A Meldrum Group, Athenaeum Gallery
 1920 June, A Meldrum Group, Athenaeum Gallery
 1921 May, A Meldrum Group, Athenaeum Gallery
 1922 May, Victorian Artists' Society Autumn Exhibition, East Melbourne
 1922 November, Victorian Artists' Society Spring Exhibition, East Melbourne
 1923 April, Victorian Artists' Society Autumn Exhibition, East Melbourne
 1923 July, Twenty Melbourne Painters, Athenaeum Gallery
 1923 October, Victorian Artists' Society Spring Exhibition, East Melbourne
 1924 May, Twenty Melbourne Painters, Athenaeum Gallery
 1925 September, Twenty Melbourne Painters, Athenaeum Gallery
 1926 September, Twenty Melbourne Painters, Athenaeum Gallery
 1926 December, Women's Art Club, Athenaeum Gallery
 1927 July, Women's Art Club, Athenaeum Gallery
 1927 September, Twenty Melbourne Painters, Athenaeum Gallery
 1928 September, Twenty Melbourne Painters, Athenaeum Gallery
 1928 October, Melbourne Society of Women Painters, Athenaeum Gallery
 1929 September, Twenty Melbourne Painters, Athenaeum Gallery
 1929 October, Melbourne Society of Women Painters, Athenaeum Gallery
 1930 September, Twenty Melbourne Painters, Athenaeum Gallery
 1930 October, Melbourne Society of Women Painters, Athenaeum Gallery
 1931 September, Twenty Melbourne Painters, Athenaeum Gallery
 1931 October, Melbourne Society of Women Painters, Athenaeum Gallery
 1931 First Contemporary All-Australian Art Exhibition, at the International Art Centre of the Roerich Museum, New York
 1932 September, Twenty Melbourne Painters, Athenaeum Gallery
 1933 March, Meldrum Gallery
 1933 September, Twenty Melbourne Painters, Athenaeum Gallery
 1934 September, Twenty Melbourne Painters, Athenaeum Gallery
 1934 October, A Meldrum Group, Athenaeum Gallery

Selected posthumous exhibitions

 1936 Athenaeum Gallery (Memorial Exhibition)
 1971-2 Homage to Clarice Beckett (1887–1935) : Idylls of Melbourne and Beaumaris. Rosalind Humphries Galleries, Melbourne
 1973 "Clarice Beckett", David Sumner Galleries, Adelaide
 1975 Macquarie Galleries, Sydney
 1978 Clarice Beckett 1887-1935, 58 Wattle Valley Road, Canterbury, 29 October
 1979 Realities, Melbourne (Retrospective Exhibition)
 1979 Macquarie Galleries, Sydney, accompanying launch of Rosalind Hollinrake's book Clarice Beckett–The Artist and Her Circle
 1980 Gallery Huntly, Canberra
 1995 "In a Certain Light" (with Olive Cotton), The University of New South Wales Ivan Dougherty Gallery, Sydney 
 1999–2000 "Politically incorrect: Clarice Beckett" A retrospective touring exhibition organised by The lan Potter Museum of Art, University of Melbourne:
 Ian Potter Museum of Art, The University of Melbourne, Melbourne, Victoria: 5 February 1999 – 28 March 1999
 S. H. Ervin Gallery (National Trust of Australia NSW), Sydney, NSW:  24 April 1999 – 13 June 1999
 Orange Regional Gallery, Orange, NSW: 19 June 1999 – 18 July 1999
 Art Gallery of South Australia, Adelaide SA: 6 August 1999 – 19 September 1999
 Bendigo Art Gallery, Bendigo, Victoria: 30 September 1999 – 31 October 1999
 Art Gallery of Ballarat, Ballarat, Victoria: 5 November 1999 – 16 January 2000
 Tasmanian Museum and Art Gallery, Hobart, Tasmania: 3 February 2000 – 26 March 2000
 Burnie Regional Art Gallery, Burnie, Tasmania: 7 April 2000 – 22 May 2000
 2000ff: Niagara Galleries, Melbourne has held three survey exhibitions of Beckett's work in 2000, 2002 and 2014.
 2021 "Clarice Beckett: The present moment"  Art Gallery of South Australia, Adelaide SA: 27 February  – 16 May

References

Bibliography
Books

 
 
 
 
 
 
 
 
 
 
 

Journals

 
 
 
 
 
 
 

Webpages

External links

Between Sea and Sky: A Portrait of Clarice Beckett, ABC Radio National

1887 births
1935 deaths
19th-century Australian women artists
20th-century Australian painters
20th-century Australian women artists
Artists from Victoria (Australia)
Australian women painters
People educated at Ballarat Grammar School
People educated at Melbourne Girls Grammar
People from Casterton, Victoria
National Gallery of Victoria Art School alumni